Irving Harold Mills (born Isadore Minsky; January 16, 1894 – April 21, 1985) was an American music publisher, musician, lyricist, and jazz artist promoter. He often used the pseudonyms Goody Goodwin and Joe Primrose.

Personal
Mills was born to a Jewish family in Odessa, Russian Empire, although some biographies state that he was born on the Lower East Side of Manhattan in New York City. His father, Hyman Minsky (1868–1905), was a hat maker who had immigrated from Odessa to the United States with his wife Sofia (née Sophia Dudis; born 1870). Hyman died in 1905, forcing Irving and his brother, Jacob (aka "Jack"; 1891–1979), to work odd jobs including bussing at restaurants, selling wallpaper, and working in the garment industry. By 1910, Mills was listed as a telephone operator.

Mills married Beatrice ("Bessie") Wilensky (1896–1976) in 1911 and they subsequently moved to Philadelphia. By 1918, Mills was working for publisher Leo Feist. His brother, Jack, was working as a manager for McCarthy and Fisher, the music publishing firm of lyricist Joseph McCarthy (1883–1943) and songwriter Fred Fisher (1875–1942).

He died in Palm Springs, California in 1985 at age 91.

Mills Music publishing
In July 1919, Irving Mills (vice-president), his brother, Jack (president), and Samuel Jesse Buzzell (secretary and counselor), founded Jack Mills, Inc., which was eventually renamed Mills Music, Inc. in 1928. Mills Music acquired the bankrupt Waterson, Berlin & Snyder, Inc. in 1929. Buzzell's son, Loring Buzzell, briefly worked for the company from March 1949 to October 1950. Irving, Jack and Samuel sold Mills Music February 25, 1965, to Utilities and Industries Corporation (a utility company based in New York). In 1969, Utilities and Industries Corporation merged Mills Music with Belwin, another music publisher, to form Belwin-Mills. Educational publisher Esquire Inc. (who had recently sold the magazine) announced its acquisition of Belwin-Mills in 1979. Gulf & Western acquired Esquire Inc. in 1983 and sold the Belwin-Mills print business to Columbia Pictures Publications in 1985. CPP later ended at Filmtrax and Filmtrax was acquired by EMI Music Publishing in 1990. Today, Mills Music catalog is managed by Sony Music Publishing which acquired EMI Music Publishing in 2012.

The Mills Music Trust
Utilities and Industries Corporation restructured Mills Music as The Mills Music Trust.  At the time of the sale, the top 10 earning compositions were:

 "Stardust"
 "When You're Smiling"
 "The Syncopated Clock"
 "Moonglow"
 "Sleigh Ride"
 "I Can't Give You Anything But Love"
 "Caravan"
 "Blue Tango"
 "Mood Indigo"
 "Who's Sorry Now?"

For the year ending 1963, 114 titles brought in 77 percent of the royalty income for five years.  The total number of compositions, at the time of sale, were estimated to be in excess of 25,000, of which, 1,500 were still producing royalties.  In 1964, Mills had royalties of $1.3 million.  The company encompassed 20 music publishing subsidiaries (some of which were acquired for $300), as well as publishing concerns in Britain, Brazil, Canada, France, then West Germany, Mexico, the Netherlands, and Spain.

Structure of the trust 
The Mills Music Trust traded in units OTC (over-the-counter) under the symbol MMTRS.  The trust received payments from EMI Records based on a complex formula that changed in 2010, when the trust passed almost all of the funds to unit holders.

Selected discoveries 
Both Jack and Irving discovered a number of great songwriters, including Zez Confrey, Sammy Fain, Harry Barris, Gene Austin, Hoagy Carmichael, Jimmy McHugh, and Dorothy Fields. He greatly advanced and even started a few of the careers of Cab Calloway, Duke Ellington, Ben Pollack, Jack Teagarden, Benny Goodman, Will Hudson, Raymond Scott and many others.

Although he only sang a little, Irving decided to put together his own studio recording group. He started the group Irving Mills and his Hotsy Totsy Gang with Tommy Dorsey, Jimmy Dorsey, Joe Venuti, Eddie Lang, Arnold Brillhardt (1904–1998) (clarinet, soprano and alto sax), Arthur Schutt, and Mannie Klein. Other variations of his bands featured Glenn Miller, Benny Goodman, and Red Nichols (Mills gave Red Nichols the tag "and his Five Pennies.")

In 1932 Mills founded the Rhythmakers recording group; an ensemble he created as a vehicle to record and promote jazz singer Billy Banks. A racially integrated ensemble at a time such groups were legally banned from public theatres, the recording group included several highly regarded jazz musicians among its members, including Red Allen, Jack Bland, Pee Wee Russell, Fats Waller, Eddie Condon, and Jimmy Lord.

Duke Ellington 
One evening, around 1925, Mills went to a small club on West 49th Street between 7th Avenue and Broadway called the Club Kentucky, often referred to as the Kentucky Club, formerly the Hollywood Club. The owner had brought in a small band of six musicians from Washington, D.C., and wanted to know what Mills thought of them. Instead of going out and making the rounds, Mills stayed the rest of the evening listening to the band, Duke Ellington and his Kentucky Club Orchestra.  According to lore, Mills signed Ellington the very next day. They made numerous records together, not only under the name of Duke Ellington, but using groups that incorporated Duke's sidemen, who were great instrumentalists in their own right.

Mills managed Ellington from 1926 to 1939. In his contract with Ellington, Mills owned 50% of Duke Ellington Inc. and thus gained a credit for tunes that became popular standards: "Mood Indigo", "(In My) Solitude", "It Don't Mean A Thing (If It Ain't Got That Swing)," "Sophisticated Lady", and many others now listed on the ASCAP website. He also pushed Ellington to record for Victor, Brunswick, Columbia, the "dime store labels" (Banner, Romeo, Perfect, Melotone, Cameo, Lincoln, and others) and even Hit of the Week. In spite of having a limited vocabulary, Mills was a deft lyricist. He sometimes used a ghost writer to complete his idea and sometimes built on the idea of the ghost writer. He was instrumental in Duke Ellington being hired by the Cotton Club.

Mills was one of the first to record black and white musicians together, using twelve white musicians and the Duke Ellington Orchestra on a 12-inch 78 rpm record featuring "St. Louis Blues" on one side and a medley of songs called "Gems from Blackbirds of 1928" on the other side, Mills himself singing with the Ellington Orchestra. Victor Records – soon to become RCA Victor – initially hesitated to release the record, but when Mills threatened to take his artists off the roster, he won out.

Mills thought he should ensure that the Ellington Orchestra always had top musicians and protected himself by forming the Mills Blue Rhythm Band, using them as a relief band at the Cotton Club. Cab Calloway and his band went into the Cotton Club with a new song Irving co-wrote with Calloway and Clarence Gaskill called "Minnie the Moocher".

Innovations

Band within a band concept
One of his most significant innovations was the "band within a band" concept, recording small groups to record hot small group sides for the various dime store labels.  He started this in 1928 by arranging for members of Ben Pollack's band to make records under a bewildering array of pseudonyms on dime store labels — like Banner, Oriole, Cameo, Domino, and Perfect — while Pollack had an exclusive contract with Victor.  Quite a number of these dime store small group records are considered major jazz classics by collectors.  He printed "small orchestrations" transcribed off the record, so that non-professional musicians could see how great solos were constructed. This was later done by Benny Goodman, Artie Shaw, and several other bands.

Booking company
Irving also formed Mills Artists Booking Company. It was in 1934 that he formed an all-female orchestra, headed by Ina Ray. He added the name Hutton and it became the popular Ina Ray Hutton and her Orchestra.

Music publishing
In 1934 as well, Mills Music began a publishing subsidiary, Exclusive Publications, Inc., specializing in orchestrations by the likes of Will Hudson (1908–1981) who co-wrote the song "Mr. Ghost Goes to Town" with Mills and Mitchell Parish in 1936.

Record labels
In late 1936, with involvement by Herbert Yates of the American Record Corporation, Mills founded the Master and Variety labels, which for their short life span were distributed by ARC through their Brunswick and Vocalion label sales staff. (Mills was  previously involved in A&R for Columbia in 1934–36, after ARC purchased the failing label.) Irving signed Helen Oakley Dance to supervise the small group records for the Variety label (35 cents or 3 for $1.00). The Master label sold for 75 cents. From December 1936, through about September 1937, many records were issued on these labels (40 were issued on Master and 170 on Variety). Master's best selling artists were Duke Ellington, Raymond Scott, as well as Hudson-De Lange Orchestra, Casper Reardon and Adrian Rollini. Variety's roster included Cab Calloway, Red Nichols, the small groups from Ellington's band led by Barney Bigard, Cootie Williams, Rex Stewart, and Johnny Hodges, as well as Noble Sissle, Frankie Newton, The Three Peppers, Chu Berry, Billy Kyle, and other major and minor jazz and pop performers around New York.

By late 1937, multiple problems caused the collapse of these labels. The Brunswick and Vocalion sales staff had problems of their own, with competition from Victor and Decca, and it was difficult to get this new venture off the ground. Mills tried to arrange for distribution overseas to get his music issued in Europe, but was unsuccessful. After the collapse of the labels, those titles that were still selling on Master were reissued on Brunswick and those still selling on Variety were reissued on Vocalion. Mills continued his M-100 recording series after the labels were taken over by ARC, and after cutting back recording to just the better-selling artists, new recordings made from about January 1938 by Master were issued on Brunswick (and later Columbia) and Vocalion (later the revived Okeh) until May 7, 1940. Beginning March 8, 1939, an Ellington session, the prefix "W" was added to matrices (e.g., WM-990 and WM-991). This matrix series was then used until WM-1150, the final being a session by the Adrian Rollini Trio performing "The Girl With the Light Blue Hair," Voc/Okeh 5979, May 7, 1940, New York City.  There were 1,055 session in the series.

Mills was recording all the time and became the head of the American Recording Company, which is now Columbia Records. Once radio blossomed Mills was singing at six radio stations seven days a week plugging Mills tunes. Jimmy McHugh, Sammy Fain, and Gene Austin took turns being his pianist.

Filmography 
He produced one picture, Stormy Weather, for 20th Century Fox in 1943, which starred Lena Horne, Cab Calloway, Zutty Singleton, and Fats Waller and the dancers the Nicholas Brothers and Bill "Bojangles" Robinson. He had a contract to do other movies but found it "too slow;" so he continued finding, recording, and plugging music.

Selected recording artists 
Among the artists Mills personally recorded were:

 Irving Aaronson and his Commanders
 Vic Berton's Orchestra
 Billy Banks Orchestra
 Cab Calloway Orchestra
 Chocolate Dandies
 Duke Ellington and his Orchestra
 Frank Froeba Orchestra
 Sonny Greer and his Memphis Men
 Ina Ray Hutton and Her Melodears
 Jimmie Lunceford
 Wingy Manone Orchestra
 Red McKenzie
 Red Nichols & His Five Pennies
 Louis Prima Orchestra
 Chuck Richards
 Joe Venuti
 Will Hudson–Eddie DeLange Orchestra
 Lud Gluskin Orchestra
 Red Norvo & His Swing Septet
 Rex Stewart Orchestra
 Benny Carter Orchestra
 Buster Bailey Orchestra
 Joe Haymes Orchestra
 Mannie Klein Orchestra

Notes and references 
Notes

General references

 American song. The Complete Musical Theater Companion (2nd ed.) (Mills in Vol. 2 of 4), by Ken Bloom, Schirmer Books (1996); 
 The Penguin Encyclopedia of Popular Music, Donald Clarke (ed.), Viking Press (1989); 
 The Encyclopedia of Popular Music (3rd ed.) (Mills is in Vol. 5 of 8), Colin Larkin, Muze (1998); 
 ASCAP Biographical Dictionary of Composers, Authors and Publishers (4th ed.), (Jacques Cattell Press (ed.), R. R. Bowker (1980); 
 Music Printing and Publishing, Stanley John Sadie & Donald William Krummel, PhD (eds.), Macmillan Press, New Grove Handbooks in Music (1990), pg. 340; 

Inline citations

External links
 Bob Mills: Irving Mills 1894–1985 at Red Hot Jazz Archive
 Note: Bob Mills (né Robert Irving Mills; 1922–2005) was Irving's son — one of seven siblings, five of whom were male
 
 
 
 Irving Mills recordings at the Discography of American Historical Recordings.

1894 births
1985 deaths
20th-century American Jews
American music publishers (people)
American people of Ukrainian-Jewish descent
Burials at Mount Sinai Memorial Park Cemetery
Duke Ellington
Musicians from New York City
People from the Lower East Side
Songwriters from New York (state)